IPM may refer to:

Organizations
 Independence Party of Minnesota, a political party in Minnesota, United States
 Institute for Studies in Theoretical Physics and Mathematics, a research institute in Tehran, Iran
 Institute of Personnel Management, now the Chartered Institute of Personnel and Development
 International Partnership for Microbicides, a non-profit partnership to find a safe and effective microbicide

Science and technology
 Imipenem, an antibiotic belonging to the carbapenem class of drugs
 Inch per minute, a measure of speed or velocity
 Independent-particle model, of nuclear structure (structure of the atomic nucleus)
 Integrated power module, a fuse box in an automobile
 Interior permanent magnet, the type of motor used in a hybrid electric vehicle
 Interior-point method in mathematical programming (optimization)
 International prototype metre, a former standard to define the length of a metre
 Interplanetary medium, the material which fills the solar system
 Intranodal palisaded myofibroblastoma, a rare primary lymph node tumour
 Isopropyl myristate, a chemical used in cosmetics and perfumes
 InfoPrint Manager, IBM Advanced Function Presentation software
 IPM (software), Interactive Policy Making, an online opinion poll management system
 Intelligent Power Module, a type of high-performance module designed to drive IGBT devices

Other uses
 iPM, a spin-off program of BBC Radio 4's PM
 IPM Zmaj, a Serbian company that produces small agricultural machines
 Information Processing and Management, academic journal
 Inquisition post mortem, an English medieval and post-medieval fiscal record of the death and estate of a tenant-in-chief
 Integrated Project Management, a process area in CMMI 
 Immediate Past Master, the previous Worshipful Master of a masonic lodge
 Imperial Porcelain Factory, Saint Petersburg or (IPM)
 Indian Police Medal, a medal for gallantry and distinguished service
 Integrated pest management, a pest control strategy in agriculture
 International Plowing Match, a Canadian agricultural fair
 Macao Polytechnic Institute (Instituto Politécnico de Macau)

See also 
 IIPM (disambiguation)
 IPMS (disambiguation)